was a Japanese journalist for Yomiuri Shinbun and author.

Career
Iiboshi graduated from Seventh Higher School Zoshikan (now Kagoshima University) and from Faculty of Law, Kyoto University. He was the vice copy chief of the social news division of the national Japanese newspaper Yomiuri Shimbun.

When Shigeru Okada, the president of Tōei Film Studio, got a manuscript from the yakuza Kōzō Minō, he asked Iiboshi to rewrite it as a novel. After that, Iiboshi wrote several series of novels about yakuza conflicts and the dark side of Japanese politics.

Main works
 Jingi naki Tatakai (Battles Without Honor and Humanity) series
 Nihon no Don (Japan's Don) series

Notes

Resources
Asahi Newspaper. Gendai Nihon Jinbutsu Jiten (Who's Who Today). 1990. .

Japanese journalists
Japanese crime fiction writers
Kyoto University alumni
Kagoshima University alumni
1927 births
1996 deaths
20th-century journalists